Jakhongir Jalilov (born on 28 September 1989) is a retired Tajikistani footballer who played for FC Istiklol and the Tajikistan national football team.

Career

Club
Jalilov joined FC Istiklol in 2009, before announcing his retirement from football in June 2016, on medical grounds. His last match for Istiklol was a 2-1 friendly defeat to Lokomotiv Moscow.

International
Jalilov represented Tajikistan at the 2012 AFC Challenge Cup.

Career statistics

Club

International

Statistics accurate as of match played 29 March 2016

Honors
Istiklol
 Tajik League (4): 2010, 2011, 2014, 2015
 Tajik Cup (3): 2010, 2013, 2014
 Tajik Supercup (6) : 2010, 2011, 2012, 2014, 2015, 2016
AFC President's Cup (1): 2012

References

External links
 

1989 births
Living people
Tajikistani footballers
Tajikistan international footballers
FC Istiklol players

Association football midfielders
Association football defenders